Verkerk is a Dutch toponymic surname. The name is a contraction of van der Kerk, meaning "from (near) the church". Notable people with the surname include:

Kees Verkerk (born 1942), Dutch speed skater
Marhinde Verkerk (born 1985), Dutch judoka
Mariana Verkerk (born 1960), Dutch model, agent, and television personality
Martin Verkerk (born 1978), Dutch tennis player
Rob Verkerk (born 1960), Commander of the Royal Netherlands Navy 2014–2017

References

Dutch-language surnames
Toponymic surnames

de:Verkerk
fr:Verkerk
nds:Verkerk
nl:Verkerk
ru:Веркерк